Dueto América was a Mexican musical duo composed of siblings Carolina and David González, from Aguascalientes, Aguascalientes whose greatest success was in the late 1940s. Carolina and her sister Elvira were also the members of another duo called "Las Palomas", which had a similar style to the duo with her brother David.

Style

In addition to singing contemporary songs, Dueto América also helped to revive older, almost extinct, folk songs known as corridos (with the help of Fernando Z. Maldonado and Felipe Valdés as composers).

The duo's string accompaniment, including harp (unusual at the time), was by Jacinto Gatica.

Songs
"Ojitos Soñadores"
"El venadito"
"Tres Suspiros"
"Un Día Con Otro"
"Gaviota Traidora"
"La Vida Infausta"
"La Delgadina"
"El Corrido de Tomás y Abel"

References

Musical groups from Aguascalientes
Sibling musical duos